Wichita County is a county located in the U.S. state of Texas. As of the 2020 census, its population was 129,350. The county seat is Wichita Falls. The county was created in 1858 and organized in 1882. Wichita County is part of the Wichita Falls, Texas, TX Metropolitan Statistical Area.

Geography
The county is drained by the Wichita River and other streams.

Major highways

  Interstate 44
  U.S. Highway 82
  U.S. Highway 277
  U.S. Highway 281
  U.S. Highway 287
  State Highway 25
  State Highway 79
  State Highway 240
  State Highway 258

Adjacent counties

 Tillman County, Oklahoma (north)
 Cotton County, Oklahoma (northeast)
 Clay County (east)
 Archer County (south)
 Wilbarger County (west)
 Baylor County (southwest)

Geology

Wichita County is part of the Texas Red Beds, which are strata of red-colored sedimentary rock from the Early Permian. The fossils of Permian period vertebrates in the Texas Red Beds were first discovered by Edward Drinker Cope in 1877. Subsequent research has revealed rare fossils of Permian period amphibians like Trimerorhachis, as well as rich deposits of other Permian tetrapods such as Dimetrodon and Diadectes.

Demographics

Note: the US Census treats Hispanic/Latino as an ethnic category. This table excludes Latinos from the racial categories and assigns them to a separate category. Hispanics/Latinos can be of any race.

As of the census of 2000, there were 131,664 people, 48,441 households, and 32,891 families residing in the county. The population density was 210 people per square mile (81/km2). There were 53,304 housing units at an average density of 85 per square mile (33/km2). The racial makeup of the county was 78.76% White, 10.23% Black or African American, 0.89% Native American, 1.84% Asian, 0.09% Pacific Islander, 5.51% from other races, and 2.68% from two or more races. 12.23% of the population were Hispanic or Latino of any race.

There were 48,441 households, out of which 33.60% had children under the age of 18 living with them, 52.30% were married couples living together, 11.90% had a female householder with no husband present, and 32.10% were non-families. In 2000, there were 1,869 unmarried partner households: 1,677 heterosexual, 94 same-sex male, and 98 same-sex female.

27.20% of all households were made up of individuals, and 10.60% had someone living alone who was 65 years of age or older. The average household size was 2.49 and the average family size was 3.04.

In the county, the population was spread out, with 25.20% under the age of 18, 13.70% from 18 to 24, 29.00% from 25 to 44, 19.50% from 45 to 64, and 12.70% who were 65 years of age or older. The median age was 33 years. For every 100 females, there were 103.80 males. For every 100 females age 18 and over, there were 103.40 males.

The median income for a household in the county was $33,780, and the median income for a family was $40,937. Males had a median income of $28,687 versus $21,885 for females. The per capita income for the county was $16,965. About 10.30% of families and 13.20% of the population were below the poverty line, including 17.40% of those under age 18 and 9.80% of those age 65 or over.

Government and infrastructure

The Texas Department of Criminal Justice James V. Allred Unit is located in Wichita Falls.
Wichita County Commissioner Court members:
County Judge Woodrow “Woody” Gossom,
Commissioner Pct. 1 Mark Beauchamp,
Commissioner Pct. 2 Mickey Fincannon,
Commissioner Pct. 3 Barry Mahler, and
Commissioner Pct. 4 Jeff Watts

The Sheriff of Wichita County is David Duke. He first took office on January 1, 2009.

Politics
Wichita County is represented in the Texas House of Representatives by the Republican James Frank, a businessman from Wichita Falls. Wichita County has about 77% of the population of Texas' 69th state house district, 18% of the population of the 13th congressional district, and 15% of the population of the 30th state senate district.

Presidential elections
In 2008, Wichita County cast the majority of its votes for Republican John McCain. He won 69% of the vote and 31,673 votes. Democrat Barack Obama received 30% of the vote and 13,828 votes. Other candidates received 1% of the vote. In 2004, Republican George W. Bush did better than John McCain and won 71% of the vote and 32,472 votes. Democrat John F. Kerry won 28% of the vote and 12,819 votes.

Communities

Cities
 Cashion Community
 Burkburnett
 Electra
 Iowa Park
 Wichita Falls (county seat)

Town
 Pleasant Valley

Unincorporated communities
 Haynesville
 Kamay
 Valley View

Ghost Towns
 Clara

Education
School districts serving the county include:
 Burkburnett Independent School District
 City View Independent School District
 Electra Independent School District
 Holliday Independent School District
 Iowa Park Consolidated Independent School District
 Wichita Falls Independent School District

The county is in the service area of Vernon College.

See also

 List of museums in North Texas
 National Register of Historic Places listings in Wichita County, Texas
 Recorded Texas Historic Landmarks in Wichita County
 The Kell House

References

External links
 Official Wichita County Website
 
 Historic Wichita County materials, hosted by the Portal to Texas History.
 Sheppard Air Force Base Home Page

 
1882 establishments in Texas
Populated places established in 1882
Wichita Falls metropolitan area